Pseudoallelism is a state in which two genes with similar functions are located so close to one another on a chromosome that they are genetically linked. This means that the two genes (pseudoalleles) are nearly always inherited together. Since the two genes have related functions, they may appear to act as a single gene. In rare cases, the two linked pseudoalleles can be separated, or recombined. One hypothesis is that pseudoalleles are formed as a result of gene duplication events, and the duplicated genes can undergo gene evolution to develop new functions.

Characteristic of pseudoalleles:

 These are closely linked allele within which crossing over occur.
 They affect the same character.

Example:

Red eye colour of Drosophila has different mutants like white and apricot. They affect pigmentation i.e., affect the same character. So, they are allelic. They can undergo recombination, i.e., they are nonallelic.

References

Genetics